Mehrdad Mohammadi (born September 29, 1993) is an Iranian football winger who recently plays for Qatari football club Al-Arabi in the Qatar Stars League.

Personal life
He is originally from Kashmarz, Qazvin Province. He is the twin brother of Milad Mohammadi.

Club career

Rah Ahan
Mohammadi signed his first professional contract with Rah Ahan in the summer of 2014 after spending the past two years with Oghab Tehran U21. He rejected an offer from Esteghlal in January 2016 after revealing he is a supporter of rival team Persepolis

Sepahan
Mohammadi joined Sepahan on 14 June 2016 with signing a five-year contract. He has also offers from Persepolis and Paykan.

Desportivo Aves
Mehrdad Mohammadi joined Desportivo Aves in May 2019.

On July 21, 2020, he terminated his contract after the club failed to pay him for 3 months.

International career

He made his debut against Cambodia in a 2022 FIFA World Cup qualifying match on 10 October 2019.

International goals
Scores and results list Iran's goal tally first.

Club career statistics

References

1993 births
Living people
Iranian footballers
Iran international footballers
Steel Azin F.C. players
Rah Ahan players
Sepahan S.C. footballers
C.D. Aves players
Al-Arabi SC (Qatar) players
Persian Gulf Pro League players
Primeira Liga players
Qatar Stars League players
Sportspeople from Tehran
Twin sportspeople
Iranian twins
Association football wingers
Association football midfielders
Iranian expatriate footballers
Expatriate footballers in Portugal
Expatriate footballers in Qatar
Iranian expatriate sportspeople in Portugal
Iranian expatriate sportspeople in Qatar